Lannédern is a commune in the Finistère department of Brittany in north-western France.

Population

See also
Communes of the Finistère department
Roland Doré sculptor
Lannédern Parish close

References

External links

Mayors of Finistère Association 

Communes of Finistère